"You Still Get to My Dreams" is a song written by A.L. "Doodle" Owens and Bill Shore, recorded by American country music artist Tammy Wynette. It was released in July 1982 as the second single from the album Soft Touch.

Background and reception
"You Still Get to Me in My Dreams" was recorded at Woodland Studios, located in Nashville, Tennessee. The recording session was produced by George Richey, Wynette's husband and musical collaborator. It was the first recording session of Wynette's to be produced by Richey. Previous recording sessions were mostly produced by Billy Sherrill, Wynette's long-time producer at Epic Records. The session included several more tracks that would appear on Wynette's 1982 studio album. Notable session musicians included Charlie McCoy playing the harmonica and Pete Wade playing guitar.

The song reached number 16 on the Billboard Hot Country Singles chart. It was released on her 1982 studio album Soft Touch.

Track listing
7" vinyl single
 "You Still Get to Me in My Dreams" – 3:09
 "If I Didn't Have a Heart" – 3:51

Charts

References 

1982 songs
1982 singles
Tammy Wynette songs
Song recordings produced by George Richey
Songs written by A.L. "Doodle" Owens
Epic Records singles